Le Redoutable (S 611) was the lead boat of her class of ballistic missile submarines in the French Marine Nationale.

Commissioned on 1 December 1971, the boat was the first French SNLE (Sous-marin Nucléaire Lanceur d'Engins, "Device-Launching Nuclear Submarine"). Le Redoutable ("formidable" or "fearsome" in French) was the only ship of the class not to be refitted with the M4 missile.

The boat was decommissioned in 1991. In 2000, the boat was removed from the water and placed in a purpose-built  dry dock, and over two years was made into an exhibit. This was a monumental task, the biggest portion of which was removing the nuclear reactor and replacing the midsection with an empty steel tube. In 2002, the boat opened as a museum ship at the Cité de la Mer naval museum in Cherbourg-Octeville, France, being now the largest submarine open to the public and the only nearly-complete ballistic missile submarine hull open to the public — although several museums display small portions, such as sails and/or parts of rudders from such submarines.  Special dinner events for organizations aboard this boat's interior spaces are offered by Cité de la Mer.

See also
 List of submarines of France
 1500 ton-class submarines
 List of submarine museums
 List of submarine classes

References

External links

 

Redoutable-class submarines (1967)
Ships built in France
1967 ships
Cold War submarines of France
Museum ships in France